The 2012–13 Loyola Greyhounds men's basketball team represented Loyola University Maryland during the 2012–13 NCAA Division I men's basketball season. The Greyhounds, led by ninth year head coach Jimmy Patsos, played their home games at Reitz Arena and were members of the Metro Atlantic Athletic Conference. They finished the season 23–12, 12–6 in MAAC play to finish in a tie for second place. They lost in the quarterfinals of the MAAC tournament to Manhattan. They were invited to the 2013 CIT where they defeated Boston University and Kent State to advance to the quarterfinals where they lost ton East Carolina.

This was their last year as members of the MAAC as they joined the Patriot League in July 2013.

Roster

Schedule

|-
!colspan=12 style="background:#00563F; color:#DBD9D1;"| Exhibition

|-
!colspan=12 style="background:#00563F; color:#DBD9D1;"| Regular season

|-
!colspan=12 style="text-align: center; background:#00563F"|2013 MAAC tournament

|-
!colspan=12 style="text-align: center; background:#00563F"| 2013 CIT

References

Loyola Greyhounds men's basketball seasons
Loyola
Loyola MD